The Chiesa dei Bigi, once known as Santa Chiara, is a late Renaissance-Baroque-style, deconsecrated Roman Catholic church in the city of Grosseto, in Tuscany, Italy.

The small church is attached to a former Clarissan order-convent in the center of the town.

History
It was consecrated in 1634 and was originally an oratory dedicated to St. Clare of Assisi, then assigned to the Company of the Saints Ludovico and Gherardo – called Bigi ("ash grey") after the colour of their clothes – in 1796. The brick facade has a bell in the center of the tympanum.

It was abandoned in the early-20th century and restored by the Diocese of Grosseto in 1977. Along with the former convent, the church was then used for cultural activities by the Comune di Grosseto. In 2019, both buildings were restructured in order to house the Museo Collezione Gianfranco Luzzetti.

See also
Catholic Church in Italy

References

Roman Catholic churches in Grosseto
Renaissance architecture in Tuscany
Baroque architecture in Tuscany
17th-century Roman Catholic church buildings in Italy